Moisés Torres (born 1 September 1965) is an Angolan judoka. He competed at the 1988 Summer Olympics and the 1992 Summer Olympics.

References

External links
 

1965 births
Living people
Angolan male judoka
Olympic judoka of Angola
Judoka at the 1988 Summer Olympics
Judoka at the 1992 Summer Olympics
Place of birth missing (living people)